is a Japanese politician of the Liberal Democratic Party, a member of the House of Representatives in the Diet (national legislature).

A native of Makabe District, Ibaraki and graduate of the University of Tokyo, he worked at the Ministry of Agriculture, Forestry and Fisheries from 1983 to 1988. He was elected to the House of Representatives for the first time in 1990.

Akagi took office as Minister of Agriculture, Forestry and Fisheries after the suicide of his predecessor, Toshikatsu Matsuoka, in May 2007. Not even two months after being inaugurated, Akagi found himself indicted in a political funding scandal not entirely different from the one his predecessor had been embroiled in - he was alleged to have registered multi-million yen expenditures on an office which did not exist. Akagi was asked to make receipts official but refused. On July 17, he appeared at a press conference with two adhesive plasters on his face, puzzling reporters but still refusing to make receipts official.

Akagi resigned as Minister on August 1, 2007, after the upper house election. Minister of the Environment, Masatoshi Wakabayashi, became concurrent Minister of Agriculture, Forestry and Fisheries and stayed until August 27, 2007, when Shinzō Abe announced a new cabinet. Akagi's virtual successor was Takehiko Endo appointed on August 27.

References

External links 
  in Japanese.

Government ministers of Japan
Members of the House of Representatives (Japan)
University of Tokyo alumni
Living people
1959 births
Liberal Democratic Party (Japan) politicians
21st-century Japanese politicians